Life Academy of Health and Bioscience, is an urban public high school located in Oakland, California.

References

High schools in Oakland, California
Public high schools in California
Small schools movement
2001 establishments in California
Oakland Unified School District
Educational institutions established in 2001